Ted Martin may refer to:
 Ted Martin (cricketer), Australian cricketer 
 Ted Martin (footballer), English footballer 
 Theodore D. Martin, United States Army general
 W. T. Martin, known as Ted, American mathematician